Barbara Neijna Martinez (born 1937) is an American artist known for her sculpture and public art works.

Neijna holds a BFA degree from Syracuse University, New York. Her work is included in the collection of the Smithsonian American Art Museum. She has lived in South Florida since 1962.

Public art
America, America, Tampa Riverwalk, 1977. Originally installed at the Hillsborough County Public Library.
Red Sea Road City of Miami Beach. Destroyed by hurricane. 
Right Turn on White, Strom Thurmond Federal Building and United States Courthouse, 1979
Elements for Passage at Dawn, Department of Education building, Tallahassee, Florida. 1986.  
Total Environment, Philadelphia, 1986
Foreverglades, Miami International Airport, South terminal expansion, 2007.

References

1937 births
Artists from Philadelphia
Living people